HC Belgorod is an ice hockey team in Belgorod, Russia. They play in the Junior Hockey League Division B, the second level of junior ice hockey in Russia. The club was founded in 1994.

External links
 Official site

1994 establishments in Russia
Ice hockey teams in Russia
Sport in Belgorod
Ice hockey clubs established in 1994